JWH-198 is a drug from the aminoalkylindole and naphthoylindole families which acts as a cannabinoid receptor agonist. It was invented by the pharmaceutical company Sanofi-Winthrop in the early 1990s. JWH-198 has a binding affinity at the CB1 receptor of 10 nM, binding around four times more tightly than the parent compound JWH-200, which has no substitution on the naphthoyl ring. It has been used mainly in molecular modelling of the cannabinoid receptors.

In the United States, all CB1 receptor agonists of the 3-(1-naphthoyl)indole class such as JWH-198 are Schedule I Controlled Substances.

See also 
 JWH-081
 JWH-193

References 

JWH cannabinoids
Aminoalkylindoles
Naphthoylindoles
4-Morpholinyl compunds
Designer drugs
CB1 receptor agonists